Waghadi Dam, is an earthfill and gravity dam on Waghadi river near Ghatanji, Yavatmal district in the state of Maharashtra in India.

Specifications

Purpose
 Irrigation

See also
 Dams in Maharashtra
 List of reservoirs and dams in India

References

Dams in Yavatmal district
Dams completed in 1978
1978 establishments in Maharashtra